Armand Bernard (born Armand Joseph Bernard; 21 March 1893 – 13 June 1968) was a French comic actor and composer known mainly for his prolific work in film.

Selected filmography

 Le traitement du hoquet (1918)
 The Little Cafe (1919) - Bouzin
 Les Trois Mousquetaires (1921, Short) - Planchet
 The Black Diamond (1922) - Gottfried
 The Two Pigeons (1922) - Le cousin Planchet
 Vingt ans après (1922) - Planchet
 L'homme inusable (1923) - Planchet - un jeune désespéré
 Décadence et grandeur (1923) - Planchet
 My Aunt from Honfleur (1923) - Armand Berthier
 À la gare (1924) - Mumudec
 Mimi Pinson (1924) - Coline
 Miracle of the Wolves (1924) - Bische
  (1925) - Armand de Bois d'Enghien
 L'éveilleur d'instincts (1925)
 Napoleon (1927) - Jean-Jean (uncredited)
 Rue de la paix (1927) - Abramson
 The Chess Player (1927) - Roubenko
 Education of a Prince (1927) - Le comte de Ronceval
 Paris la nuit (1930, Short) - Cramoisi
 La place est bonne! (1930, Short) - M Pavillon
 Eau, gaz et amour à tous les étages (1930, Short) - Le pompier de service
 Love Songs (1930)
 The Million (1931) - Le chef d'orchestre
 The Typist (1931) - Jules Fanfarel
 Fra Diavolo (1931) - Scaramanzia
 Tout s'arrange (1931) - Robert
 Calais-Dover (1931) - Jean
 Le congrès s'amuse (1931) - Bibikoff
 Les monts en flammes (1931) - Le soldat autrichien
 La femme de mes rêves (1931) - Achaz
 Général, à vos ordres (1931)
 Ma tante d'Honfleur (1931)
 A Night at a Honeymoon (1931)
 The Woman Dressed As a Man (1932) - M. Gray
 Tumultes (1932) - Le bègue
 The Miracle Child (1932) - Lescalopier
 Quick (1932) - Lademann, Quick's manager
 Tu m'oublieras (1932) - Isidore
 If You Wish It (1932) - Jérôme
 Monsieur de Pourceaugnac (1932) - Monsieur de Pourceaugnac
 Chassé-croisé (1932)
 My Dream Woman (1932) - Émile
 Le petit Babouin (1932) - Babouin
 Antoinette (1932)
 Let's Touch Wood (1933) - Auguste Chantilly
 Les vingt-huit jours de Clairette (1933) - Michonnet
 The Merry Monarch (1933) - Taxis
 The Adventures of King Pausole (1933, German) - Texis
 The Adventures of King Pausole (1933, French) - Texis
 La margoton du bataillon (1933) - Désiré Chopin
 Le fakir du Grand Hôtel (1934) - Le professeur Demonio
 Caprice de princesse (1934) - Barnabé
 Dactylo se marie (1934) - Jules Fanfarel
 Chansons de Paris (1934) - Armand
 Flofloche (1934) - Antonin Floche
 Le secret d'une nuit (1934) - Coco
 Three Sailors (1934) - Favouille
 L'école des contribuables (1934) - Gaston Valtier
 Paris-Deauville (1934) - Sosthène
 The Uncle from Peking (1934) - Antoine Robichon
 Nemo's Bank (1934)
 Le Billet de mille (1935) - Un soldat
 Compartiment de dames seules (1935) - Robert de Mérinville
 Aux portes de Paris (1935) - L'anguille
 Une nuit de noces (1935) - Laverdet
 Les dieux s'amusent (1935) - Mercure / Sosie
 La famille Pont-Biquet (1935) - La Reynette
 Dora Nelson (1935)
 Sacré Léonce (1936) - Léonce Vavin
 Michel Strogoff (1936) - Harry Blount
 You Can't Fool Antoinette (1936) - Hubert de Prémaillac
 L'école des journalistes (1936) - Alfred
 Oeil de lynx, détective (1936) - Marc Lanterne
 Les gaietés du palace (1936) - Honoré
 La dernière valse (1936) - Le vieux général
 Ménilmontant (1936)
 La peau d'un autre (1937) - Amédée Lambelin
 Pantins d'amour (1937) - Charles Prunier
 Le club des aristocrates (1937) - Alfred
 The Buttock (1937) - Le vicomte Édouard
 Le monsieur de 5 heures (1938) - Célestin Maravel
 Boys' School (1938) - Mazeau, le concierge
 Les femmes collantes (1938) - Séraphim Campluchard
 Conflict (1938) - Le greffier / Secretary
 Place de la Concorde (1939) - Altesse 
 Raphaël le tatoué (1939) - Roger Drapeau
 The Fatted Calf (1939) - Gabriel Vachon
 The World Will Shake (1939) - Martelet
 The Merry Monarch (1939) - Monsieur Nicolas
 Sacred Woods (1939) - Monsieur des Fargottes
 Radio Surprises (1940) - M. Bontemps
 Ils étaient cinq permissionnaires (1945) - Abel Broux
 Father Serge (1945) - Aphamazy
 Hoboes in Paradise (1946) - Le croque-mort
 Destines (1946) - Lobligeois
 Noah's Ark (1947) - Le baron Hugues Casenove
 Mandrin (1947) - Sansonnet
 Bichon (1948) - Augustin
 Impeccable Henri (1948) - Lopez
 The Woman I Murdered (1948) - Dupont-Verneuil
 On demande un assassin (1949) - Le croquemort
 Lost Souvenirs (1950) - Armand, le majordome de Jean-Pierre (episode "Une couronne mortuaire")
 Coeur-sur-Mer (1950) - Modeste Cotivet
 Les maître-nageurs (1950) - Billotte
 Demain nous divorçons (1951) - Saturnin
 Les mémoires de la vache Yolande (1951) - L'agent 3333
 Coq en pâte (1951) - Le chasseur du restaurant
 Piédalu à Paris (1951) - M. Finnois
 Ce coquin d'Anatole (1951) - Me Tedet
 Les deux Monsieur de Madame (1951) - Monsieur Chèvre
 Un amour de parapluie (1951, Short)
 Le costaud des Batignolles (1952) - Nicolas - Le valet de chambre
 Trois vieilles filles en folie (1952) - Arsène Cupidon
 Naked in the Wind (1953) - Théophase Darcepoil
 Des quintuplés au pensionnat (1953) - L'Inspecteur d'Académie
 My Childish Father (1953) - Révérend James Holiday
 Boum sur Paris (1953) - Calchas
 Trois jours de bringue à Paris (1954) - L'agent matrimonial Cocarel
 On déménage le colonel (1955) - M. Grivier
 Coup dur chez les mous (1956) - L'oncle
 Le colonel est de la revue (1957) - Le colonel
 Miss Catastrophe (1957) - Le directeur de la banque
 Pas de grisbi pour Ricardo (1957)
 Une nuit au Moulin-Rouge (1957)
 Fumée blonde (1957) - L'illusionniste Grand Jacoby
 La blonde des tropiques (1957) - Inspecteur Fourache
 It's All Adam's Fault (1958) - L'ambassadeur
 La môme aux boutons (1958)
 Loin de Rueil (1961, TV Movie) - Des Cigales
 La bande à Bobo (1963) - Antoine
 Les aventures de Monsieur Pickwick (1964, TV Mini-Series) - Winckle

References

Armand Bernard at Virtual History

1893 births
1968 deaths
People from Bois-Colombes
French male film actors
French male silent film actors
20th-century French male actors
Troupe of the Comédie-Française
20th-century French comedians